David Burton Hobman  (27 June 1927 – 24 December 2003) was a British social and elder rights activist, broadcaster and the first Director of Age Concern England.

External links
 David Hobman: Energetic reformer who changed society's perception of older people and charities, Obituary, The Guardian, 16 January 2004
 Daily Telegraph obituary (21 January 2004)

1927 births
2003 deaths
Commanders of the Order of the British Empire
Elder rights activists
People educated at Blundell's School